Wipro Supernova is the name of a series of high-performance computing (HPC) solutions offered by Wipro Infotech.

Features 

The product is offered under 3 segments: entry level, mid-segment and high-end, which have varying performance and storage capacities. The entry level system costs  ₹25,00,000; and performs at 1 TeraFLOPS and has a storage capacity of 4 TB. They use the Gluster software stack.

See also
Supercomputing in India

References

External links
Wipro Supernova (Product Page) - dead link

Supercomputers
Supercomputing in India